Benincasa hispida, the wax gourd, also called ash gourd, white gourd, winter gourd, winter melon, tallow gourd, ash pumpkin, Chinese preserving melon is a vine grown for its very large fruit, eaten as a vegetable when mature. It is the only member of the genus Benincasa.

It is native to South and Southeast Asia. The wax gourd is widely grown throughout Asia, including Java and Japan, the places where it is thought to have originated.

One variety of the plant, called chi qua (Benincasa hispida var. chieh-qua), is commonly used in Asian cuisine.

Etymology 
The name "winter melon" that is sometimes given to this plant is based on the Chinese name ; however, the character  can also mean "gourd" or "squash". It is likely that the name "melon" is given because this gourd is sometimes candied or made into a sweet tea.

The name "wax gourd" comes from the wax coating in the fruit's skin.

Description 

The plant grows thick vines with coarse and hairy stems.

In early summer from June to September, golden yellow flowers form in the leaf axils.

Fruit 
After they are fertilized, they bear spherical fruits 50–60 cm long by 10–25 cm wide; young fruits are covered with soft fuzzy hairs which eventually disappear and develop a waxy coating that gives it the fruit a long shelf life of up to a year.

The melon may grow as large as 80 cm in length. The fruit has thick flesh that is sweet, crisp and juicy; it has white or yellow seeds.

Cultivation 
It is grown in well-drained loam and sandy soils in warm, mild climates, and will not tolerate frosts. It is grown in riverbeds or furrows, and needs constant irrigation during the growing season.

Uses 
The wax gourd can be stored for many months, much like winter squash. Ash gourds of the Indian subcontinent have a white coating with a rough texture (hence the name ash gourd). Southeast Asian varieties have a smooth waxy texture. It is one of the few vegetables available during winter in areas of deciduous vegetation. In India, the wax gourd is recognized for its medicinal properties in the Ayurvedic system of medicine. It also has significance in spiritual traditions of India and Yoga, where it is identified as a great source of prana.

In Cambodia, it is known as tralach, and used in soup and stews in Cambodian cuisine. It is commonly used to make samlor tralach, which is winter gourd and pork soup, or stuffed pork in the gourd.

In Chinese cuisine, the gourds are used in stir fries or combined with pork or pork/beef bones to make winter gourd soup, often served in the scooped out gourd, carved by scraping off the waxy coating. It is also chopped and candied as wintermelon candy (dōng guā táng), commonly eaten at New Year festivals, or as filling for Sweetheart cake (lǎopó bǐng). It has also been used as the base filling in Chinese and Taiwanese mooncakes for the Moon Festival.

In Vietnamese cuisine, it is called bí đao, and is usually used to make soup or stew. When cooked with pork short ribs, the resulting soup is traditionally thought to help produce more milk for breastfeeding mothers.

In the Philippines, it is candied (referred to plainly as kundol) and is used as a pastry filling for hopia. It is also an ingredient in some savory soups (sabaw) and stir-fries (guisado).

In Indian cuisine it is traditionally used to prepare a wide variety of dishes. In northern India it is used to prepare a candy called petha. In South Indian cuisine, it is traditionally used to make a variety of curries, including a stew made with a yogurt base. The juice of the raw ash gourd (Maipawl or Khar) is used by the Mizo community and indigenous Assamese ethnicities of North-East India as a natural remedy to treat mild to severe dysentery. In north India, particularly in the middle Himalayas, it is paired with pulses such as moong which, when crushed, along with winter gourd, make a dish locally called bori. When dried in sunlight it becomes somewhat hard and is used in curry dishes and eaten with rice or chapati. This practice is especially prevalent in the Himalayas due to the long shelf life of the resulting product.

In western Bihar as well as eastern Uttar Pradesh, it is called bhathua (भथुआ). In Sri Lanka, it is called puhul (පුහුල්) and alu puhul (අළු පුහුල්). In Andhra Pradesh, it is called Boodida Gummadikaya (బూడిద గుమ్మడికాయ) (Telugu). It is used to make stews, stir fries and vadialu. Vadialu are made by chopping the gourd in small pieces and mixing with ground urad beans and spices, then sun-drying. To eat, vadialu are deep fried in oil and eaten as an accompaniment to rice and sambar or lentil stews.

In Kerala, the plant is called Kumbalam (കുമ്പളം) and the fruit is called Kumbalanga (കുമ്പളങ്ങ) or Kooshmandam (കൂശ്മാണ്ടം). It is traditionally used to offer 'Guruthi' (ഗുരുതി) instead of 'Kuruti' (കുരുതി) among Malayali Brahmins. Thus, instead of offering someone's life in the pyre, an ash gourd is cut into two as a symbolic performance in lieu of human sacrifice.

In Karnataka, the ash gourd is known as Boodu Kumbalakaayi (ಬೂದು ಕುಂಬಳಕಾಯಿ) (Kannada) and Boldu Kumbda in Tulu, and is used to prepare dishes like Kodel (Sambhar), Ale bajji, Kashi Halwa and chutney.
It is widely used during Dasara and other festivities while performing pooje.

In Maharashtra, the ash gourd is known as Kohalaa in Marathi language, Kohala is used to prepare a sweet dish called Kohalyachi Vadee (Burfi), it is also used to preparing (Sambhar).

In Gujarat, it is called kolu (કોળુ).

In Bengal, it is called "ChaalKumro" (চালকুমড়ো ). There are various dished made with it, viz., ChalKumro’r Bora, Chalkumro ghonto, Chalkumror dudh curry,  with mung dal, etc.

In Odisha it is called (ପାଣି କଖାରୁ), it is used in various types of recipe all over Odisha. It is the main ingredient to prepare a very tasty candy like food (ବଡ଼ି) for curry or as a supplement mainly with watered rice.

In Nepal, where it is called Kubhindo, it is cooked as a vegetable when young, but the ripe gourds are usually made into preserves or crystallized candy known as "murabba" or "petha".

Occasionally, it is used to produce a fruit drink with a distinctive taste. It is usually sweetened with caramelized sugar. In Southeast Asia, the drink is marketed as wax gourd tea or wax gourd punch.

The shoots, tendrils, and leaves of the plant may also be eaten as greens.

The ash gourd is also used by Hindus as a sacrificial offering in lieu of animal sacrifice. The gourd is marked with vermillion and split in two with a sword.

2020 mystery seed mail 
In summer of 2020, several states across the U.S. reported mysterious, unsolicited packages containing unknown and unidentified seeds of various kinds - the envelopes presented Chinese text in many cases.  At least one person planted one type of these seeds, which grew and was analyzed before state officials destroyed the plant. This proved to be Benincasa hispida.

Gallery

References

External links

Cucurbitoideae
Flora of Nepal
Fruit vegetables
Medicinal plants
Melons

Philippine cuisine